Greater Paris may refer to:

Active administrative divisions 
 Grand Paris, a métropole covering the City of Paris and its nearest surrounding suburbs created in 2016
Paris and the Petite Couronne (its inner ring of surrounding departments)
 Île-de-France (region), includes an outer ring (Grande Couronne) of surrounding departments
 Paris aire urbaine, metropolitan area, largely overlaps with the Grande Couronne

Former administrative divisions 

 Seine (department) (abolished 1968), Paris and adjacent suburbs

See also
 Paris (disambiguation)